JS Tone (DE-234) is the sixth ship of the s. She was commissioned on 8 February 1993.

Construction and career
Tone was laid down at Sumitomo Heavy Industries Tokyo Shipyard on 8February 1991 and launched on 6 December 1991. She was commissioned on 8 February 1993 and deployed to Sasebo.

It was planned for the destroyer escort to be open to the public at Shibushi Port along with the escort vessels , JS Sawakaze, and the transport vessel  at the Kanoya Air Festival held from 19 to 20 May 2001, but Fukuejima a Chinese Navy's ice-breaking information gathering ship sailing offshore was canceled due to tracking and monitoring. After leaving Sasebo on 2 October, the same year, she engaged in warning and surveillance activities for the US Navy amphibious assault ship .

The frigate , spy ship  and supply ship  were discovered together by P-3C aircraft belonging to the 5th Air Group and the support ship . After that, four ships were spotted heading west through the Ōsumi Strait. On 25 December, the Joint Staff Office of the Ministry of Defense announced that Tone was in the waters of the central East China Sea at around 4 pm on the 24th of the same month, with the Chinese Navy aircraft carrier , three missile destroyers and three frigate ships, and one supply ship, visually confirming the aircraft carrier's presence. This is the first time that the Maritime Self-Defense Force has visually confirmed the aircraft carrier of the Chinese Navy.

Gallery

Citations

External links

1992 ships
Abukuma-class destroyer escorts
Ships built by Sumitomo Heavy Industries